Defense Play is a 1988 American action-drama film directed by Monte Markham, and starring David Oliver, Susan Ursitti, Monte Markham, Eric Gilliom, Jamie McMurray, Jack Esformes, and William Frankfather. The film was released by Trans World Entertainment on September 9, 1988.

Plot
Professor Vandemeer works on a secret project for the US-Air-Force called DART: a very small helicopter for scouting and defense. When he gets killed, Colonel Denton gets under suspicion. His son Scott and Vandemeers daughter Karen believe in his innocence and search for the true murderer and his motives.

Cast
David Oliver as Scott Denton
Susan Ursitti as Karen Vandemeer
Monte Markham as Mark Denton
Eric Gilliom as Bill Starkey
Jamie McMurray as Norm Beltzer
Jack Esformes as Eddie Dietz
William Frankfather as General Phillips
Tom Rosqui as Chief Gill
Milos Kirek as Anton
Patch Mackenzie as Ann Denton
Terence Cooper as Professor Vandemeer
Susan Krebs as Margaret Fields
Jonathon Wise as Nick
Dah-ve Chodan as Audrey Denton
Ron Recasner as Mike Agee
J. Downing as Nicholai
Allan Kolman as Russian Radioman
Glenn Morshower as Bartender
Rutanya Alda as Victoria Vandemeer
Stacey Adams as Kelly
Jim Beaver as FBI Man
John Ingle as Senator
Elliot Jonathan Klein as Air Force Colonel (uncredited)
Tony Lima as (uncredited)
Stephen Tako as Inspector (uncredited)
Thadd Turner as Rancher (uncredited)

References

External links

1980s action drama films
1988 films
American action drama films
1988 drama films
1980s English-language films
1980s American films